On Purpose is the twelfth studio album by American country music artist Clint Black. It was released on September 25, 2015 via Thirty Tigers and Black Top Records. Black wrote all of the album's fourteen tracks. The album was produced by Black.

Track listing

Personnel
 Clint Black - lead vocals
 Lisa Hartman Black - duet vocals on track 6
 Big & Rich - guest vocals on track 12
 Dane Bryant - piano
 Jimmy Carter - bass
 Perry Coleman - backing vocals 
 Eric Darken - percussion
 Glen Duncan - fiddle
 Stuart Duncan - fiddle
 John Ferarro - drums
 Shannon Forrest - drums
 Larry Franklin - fiddle, mandolin
 Paul Franklin - pedal steel guitar
 Tania Hancheroff - backing vocals 
 Wes Hightower - backing vocals
 Victor Indrizzo - drums
 Los Angeles Orchestra
 B. James Lowry - acoustic guitar
 Brent Mason - electric guitar
 Gordon Mote - piano
 Hayden Nicholas - slide guitar, electric guitar
 Dean Parks - acoustic guitar, electric guitar
 Michael Rhodes - bass
 John Robinson - drums
 Matt Rollings - keyboards
 Dwain Rowe - keyboards
 Leland Sklar - bass
 Neil Stubenhaus - bass
 Bryan Sutton - mandolin
 Russell Terrell - backing vocals
 Ilya Toshinsky - acoustic guitar, banjo
 Biff Watson - acoustic guitar
 Jake Willemain - bass
 Lonnie Wilson - drums

Charts

References

2015 albums
Clint Black albums
Albums produced by Clint Black